Kaitlyn Torpey (born 31 March 2000) is an Australian professional women's footballer who plays as a defender for Melbourne City.

Early life
At the age of nine, her dream was becoming a W-League as she had made a markable performance on her way to professional women's football. Between 2005 and 2014, she was a hockey player and therefore switched sports to soccer.

Club career

Youth career

Olympic FC
In 2013, Torpey started her youth career playing for the U-13's Olympic FC Girls. She scored 27 goals in 21 matches in the 2013 season and finished 1st on the ladder.

Brisbane Roar QAS
Over her career with QAS, she played 38 matches and scored 13 goals when playing for the U13s and U14s. In 2016, she was named in the All-Star Team in her third NTC Challenge competition.

Brisbane Roar
On 5 November 2016, Torpey played her first professional career game in a 2–1 win over Sydney FC.

Melbourne City
In September 2021, Torpey joined Melbourne City.

International career
In October 2017, Kaitlyn Torpey was called up for the Young Matildas squad for the 2017 AFC U19 Championship in China.

References

External links
 Kaitlyn Torpey

2000 births
Living people
Brisbane Roar FC (A-League Women) players
Melbourne City FC (A-League Women) players
A-League Women players
Women's association football defenders
Australian women's soccer players